Cyril Dreyer (born 19 March 1994) is a French footballer who plays for Spanish club Sporting de Gijón B as a central midfielder.

Club career
Born in Strasbourg, Dreyer finished his formation with RC Strasbourg. In 2012, after the club's dissolution, he moved to AS Nancy, being assigned to the reserves in Championnat de France amateur.

On 26 August 2014 Dreyer made his professional debut, coming on as a second-half substitute for François Bellugou in a 0–3 Coupe de la Ligue away loss against AJ Auxerre. Roughly a year later he moved abroad for the first time in his career, joining Spanish side Sporting de Gijón but being assigned to its B-team in Segunda División B.

References

External links

1994 births
Living people
Footballers from Strasbourg
French footballers
Association football midfielders
AS Nancy Lorraine players
Sporting de Gijón B players
French expatriate footballers
French expatriate sportspeople in Spain
Expatriate footballers in Spain
Segunda División B players